Cináed mac Flainn (died 770) was the king of the Uí Failge, a Laigin people of County Offaly. He was one of the many sons of Fland Dá Chongal, a previous king. He ruled from 757 to 770. He was the second of Fland's sons by Érenach, daughter of Murchad Midi (died 715) of Uisnech to hold the throne.

In 770 he challenged the authority of the over king of Leinster, Cellach mac Dúnchada (died 776). This coincided with attacks launched by the southern Ui Neill including the high king Donnchad Midi (died 797). Cináed was defeated and slain at the Battle of Áth Orc (in County Offaly) along with his brother Cellach and his ally Cathnia mac Bécce of the Fothairt.

His son Flaíthnia mac Cináeda (died 806) was a King of Uí Failge.

Notes

See also
 Kings of Ui Failghe

References

 Byrne, Francis John (2001), Irish Kings and High-Kings, Dublin: Four Courts Press, 
 Mac Niocaill, Gearoid (1972), Ireland before the Vikings, Dublin: Gill and Macmillan

External links 
 CELT: Corpus of Electronic Texts at University College Cork

People from County Offaly
770 deaths
8th-century Irish monarchs
Year of birth unknown